Miss Dynamite (Spanish: Señorita Pólvora), is a television series produced by Teleset for Sony Pictures Television and Televisa, which will be broadcast in the Latin American by TNT. It is the story of a Beauty Queen, who gets involved in a hit, which led to the premature death of her father.

It stars Camila Sodi as Valentina, Iván Sánchez as Miguel and José María de Tavira as Vicente.

Plot 
Señorita Pólvora follows Valentina, a young, beautiful and wealthy woman who falls for a hit man and thus discovers that the love of her life, and her own family, belong to one of the most powerful of Mexico drug cartels. The chronicle of their explosive life and its gradual descent into the world of crime.

Series overview

Cast

Main 
 Camila Sodi as Valentina Cárdenas
 Iván Sánchez as Miguel Galindo / M8
 José María de Tavira as Vicente Martínez
 Saúl Lisazo as Octavio Cárdenas
 Hugo Stiglitz as Isidoro Hernández
 José Sefami as Elías Vásquez
 Mauricio Isaac as Ramiro Aguilar
 Paulina Gaitán as Noemí Loaiza / Lady Beretta
 Mara Cuevas as Ivonne Marín
 Mario Zaragoza as Saúl Pedreros
 Alex Durán as Morgan
 Emilio Savinni as Salomón Flores
 Francisco "Pakey" Vázquez as Capitán Darío Montoya
 Anilú Pardo as Coronel Guadalupe Imperial
 Claudette Maillé as Alicia Cortés / La Pantera
 Rodrigo Murray as Rafael Ortíz
 Camila Selser as Zoé Suárez
 David Medel as Marcos Pineda
 Miguel Conde as Carlos "Carlitos" Mariscal
 Oka Giner as Emilia Marín
 Dino García as Jacinto Marín
 Eréndira Ibarra as Tatiana Hucke

Recurring 
 Max Flores as Ricardo
 Rodrigo Virago as Germán Castillo

Broadcast 
The series premiered on March 16, 2015 on TNT Latin America.

Soundtrack

References

External links 

Mexican telenovelas
Televisa telenovelas
Spanish-language telenovelas
Colombian telenovelas
Sony Pictures Television telenovelas
2015 telenovelas
2015 Mexican television series debuts
2015 Colombian television series debuts
2015 Mexican television series endings
2015 Colombian television series endings
2015 American television series debuts
2015 American television series endings
Works about Mexican drug cartels